Cool and Crazy is an album by American jazz trumpeter, composer and arranger Shorty Rogers originally released by RCA Victor in 1953 as a 10-inch LP.

Reception

Allmusic noted "Rogers shows a deft hand throughout, managing to make his complex and varied material sound seamless and eminently swinging. ...A classic from the '50s big-band era".

Track listing 
All compositions by Shorty Rogers.

 "Coop de Graas" - 2:58
 "Infinity Promenade" - 3:36
 "Short Stop" - 3:18
 "Boar-Jibu" - 3:37
 "Contours" - 3:21
 "Tale of an African Lobster" - 3:26
 "Chiquito Loco" - 3:28
 "The Sweetheart of Sigmund Freud" - 2:41

Recorded at RCA Studios in Hollywood, CA on March 26, 1953 (tracks 1–4) and April 2, 1953 (tracks 5–8)

Personnel 
Shorty Rogers - trumpet, arranger
Pete Candoli, Maynard Ferguson, Conrad Gozzo, John Howell - trumpet 
Milt Bernhart, Harry Betts, John Halliburton - trombone
John Graas - French horn 
Gene Englund - tuba
Art Pepper - alto saxophone,  tenor saxophone, baritone saxophone
Bud Shank - alto saxophone, baritone saxophone
Bob Cooper, Jimmy Giuffre - tenor saxophone,  baritone saxophone
Marty Paich - piano
Curtis Counce - bass 
Shelly Manne - drums

References 

Shorty Rogers albums
1953 albums
RCA Records albums
Albums arranged by Shorty Rogers
Albums produced by Jack Lewis